Usha Rajak (Nepali: उषा रजक; born 18 October 1985), is a Nepali/Nepalese actress, model, pastry chef and Nepal's representative for World Miss University 2006.

Early life (1985–2004) 
Usha Rajak was born on 18 October 1985 in Lalitpur, Nepal to Bhuvan Rajak and Shashi Rajak. When she was 5 years old, her father died from a work-related incident, leaving her mother to take care of Usha and her 4 elder sisters alone. Growing up, Usha attended a number of schools in Kathmandu, including Little Angels' and Love Buds School. In response to frequent bullying and harassment on the streets, Usha was trained in Shotokan Karate. In 2002, she graduated with a School Level Certificate from Baal Vidhya Secondary High School. Following her high school graduation, Usha studied Commerce at Prasadi Academy, from which she received an Intermediate Certificate in 2004.

Career

2004–2005: career beginnings 
In 2004, Usha began working toward her BBA at Unique Academy in Lalitpur. While studying at the academy, she ventured into the world of modeling. Her first major beauty pageant was Lux Beauty Star 2004, at which she won the title of Sunsilk Miss Beautiful Hair. Later, she worked as a runway model for brands Jawed Habib and Lakme Cosmetics. At this time, she was also featured on the covers of Wave and Lifestyle magazine. In 2005, Usha first became involved in the local theatre scene of Kathmandu. Her debut was a leading role in Bijay Malla's "Kankal", produced for the Nepalese National Theatre Competition in Chitwan, Nepal, for which she won the title of Best Actress.

2006–2009: acting and modeling 
Following the success of her debut performance, Usha began honing her acting skills at Actor's Studio Nepal's theatre training program, at which she worked with esteemed directors such as Anup Baral. During one of the studio's performances, she was spotted by film director Nirak Poudel who then offered her a leading role in his upcoming film, Kusume Rumal 2.

Beauty pageants
The first title she won in her modeling career was Sunsilk Miss Beautiful Hair, at Lux Beauty Star 2004. She then competed and won the title and represented Nepal in World Miss University, South Korea 2006. She was also able to secure the Best Actress award from the National Theatre Actors Competition held in Nepal in 2005. She later won the award for the HIV/AIDS awareness movie One Day as the Best Newcomer Actress at the Digital Film Awards, Nepal 2009.

Filmography

References

External links
 Moviesnepal.com

Living people
People from Lalitpur District, Nepal
Nepalese beauty pageant winners
Nepalese female models
Nepalese film actresses
21st-century Nepalese actresses
1985 births
Nepalese chefs